Frenchman, also known as Frenchman's Station or Bermond, was a community in Churchill County, Nevada, United States.

The community was founded in 1904 as a stagecoach stop; it took its name from Aime "Frenchy" Bermond, a French immigrant. "Frenchy's" offered a respite for people, animals and freight traveling between Fallon, Fairview and Wonder in the early 1900s. The way station provided   lodging and food, with a hotel, restaurant, saloons and stables.

The U.S. Navy bought out the community in 1985 due to its proximity to the Dixie Valley bombing range, and its remaining buildings were demolished two years later.

The community is mentioned in the book Blue Highways by William Least Heat-Moon, which includes a picture of Margaret and Laurie Chealander.

See also
 List of ghost towns in Nevada

References

Ghost towns in Churchill County, Nevada
Ghost towns in Nevada